Gittenbergia is a genus of small air-breathing land snails, terrestrial pulmonate gastropod mollusks in the family Valloniidae.

Species
Species within the genus Gittenbergia include:
 Gittenbergia sororcula (Benoit, 1859)

References

 Bank, R. A. (2017). Classification of the Recent terrestrial Gastropoda of the World. Last update: July 16th, 2017.

Valloniidae